Shenzhen International Garden and Flower Expo Park (referred to as Garden Expo Park) is a public, urban park in Futian District, Shenzhen, Guangdong, China. Located in West Zhuzilin, Shenzhen International Garden and Flower Expo Park is bordered by Shennan Avenue on the South, Qiaochengdong Road on the West, Qiaoxiang Road on the North, and Guangshen Expressway on the East. It serves multiple functions, including garden and flower expo, arts and culture, science education, tourism, exhibitions, and solar power grid-connected electricity generation. It officially opened on September 23, 2004, which was awarded the title of "National Key Park" by Ministry of Housing and Urban-Rural Development on September 12, 2008.

History
Shenzhen International Garden and Flower Expo Park was a part of the Huangniulong green isolation belt and the venue for the Fifth China International Garden and Flower Exposition co-hosted by Ministry of Housing and Urban-Rural Development (formerly Ministry of Development) and Shenzhen Municipal People’s Government. Its theme is "Nature, Home, Bright Future".

Tourist attractions
The Park is divided into three scenic areas, including the West Area, the North Area and the West Area.

West Area

North Area

East Area

See also
List of protected areas of China

References

Botanical gardens in Guangdong
Parks in Shenzhen
2004 establishments in China